Highlander: The Raven was a short-lived spin-off from the television series Highlander: The Series, continuing the saga of a female Immortal. The series followed the character of Amanda (played by Elizabeth Gracen), a character that originated as a recurring role in the earlier series. The Raven was filmed in Toronto, Ontario, Canada, and in Paris, France; it was produced by Gaumont Télévision and Fireworks Media in association with Davis–Panzer Productions.

Premise
In the pilot, Immortal thief Amanda meets Nick Wolfe (Paul Johansson), a cop who is investigating a series of robberies. During the course of the investigation, Amanda is framed for murder by a crooked cop from Nick's department. Amanda's name is cleared, but not before Nick's partner Claudia Hoffman (Torri Higginson) sacrifices her own life to save Amanda's. Nick discovers Amanda's immortality when he sees Amanda die, then get up and run away.

Claudia's death has a profound effect on Amanda, and throughout the series (with help from Nick's own strong moral code), she attempts to change and become a good person. She discovers that she caused the deaths of a battalion of soldiers in World War I, which further influences this change. Amanda finds herself facing up to Immortals, even if she does not think she can beat them, when previously, she would have run away.

In the final episode, Nick inhales a deadly poison, and is told he has 24 hours to live. Amanda, trying to do the right thing, shoots him. When he awakens a few seconds later, he discovers that he too is Immortal. The reason behind shooting him was that his immortality could only be triggered by the shock of a violent death. To Amanda's dismay, Nick is none too happy about it. The series ends on a cliffhanger with Nick walking away, angry at Amanda for not telling him that he was Immortal (which she had known all along), and for making the decision for him.

Characters

 Amanda (played by Elizabeth Gracen) – A 1,200-year-old Immortal, a thief and Duncan MacLeod's lover on multiple occasions.
 Nick Wolfe (played by Paul Johansson) – An ex-cop who befriended Amanda and together solved crimes.

Reception
Critical reaction to Highlander: The Raven has been mixed, more so than Highlander: The Series, which has received generally favorable reviews from critics. Rob Lineberger of DVD Verdict praised several episodes of the show ("War and Peace" in particular, for "recaptur[ing] the magic of classic Highlander through carefully staged flashbacks, compelling moral questions, Immortal ethics, and amazing stunt work") and said that "there is something singularly compelling about [the show], something that makes [the DVD set's] $40 street price worth considering," but said of the show overall: "The writing is below the common denominator, using clichés in the blandest ways, ... the chemistry between the two leads is rudimentary at best, with little to no character development, [and] the style of the show is somehow off, the music awkward, the direction formless."

David Nusair of Reel Film said: "[While] Gracen and Johansson are effective in their roles, ... it's not terribly difficult to see why Highlander: The Raven never took off; the show essentially abandons the sort of elements that made the previous series and all the movies so successful, choosing instead to take a less conventional route. And while all these episodes are entertaining enough, fans hoping for another by-the-book Highlander spin-off will surely be disappointed." Peter Schorn of IGN criticized the series for its "weak writing, lame action, and utter lack of chemistry between the stars." Schorn said that while the second half of the show "beg[an] to find its footing" by having a "greater sense of atmosphere" and "balanc[ing] the cast to preserve some semblance of Highlander continuity," the first half "features generic cop show convention exploited to exhaustive effect while the characters undergo rote personality arcs and character development better suited for Moonlighting knock-offs."

Jeffrey Robinson of DVD Talk also felt that "the second half of the series is more interesting [than the first]," saying: "At first I did not find the show appealing at all. The problem was the show is not Highlander and it tried to move in too many different directions. For the most part it tended to be a cop show with immortals. ... Once the series was about halfway through, my opinion began to change. I found the show was getting more entertaining as it started to fall back to the traditional format of Highlander. By the end of the last episode, I felt cheated there was not more because the finale ends with a cliffhanger that would have been a great lead into a second season." Robinson concluded: "I enjoyed watching Highlander: The Raven, but not enough to recommend it."

Episodes

Home media
Anchor Bay Entertainment has released the complete series on DVD in Region 1.

Notes

References

External links

 

1990s American drama television series
1998 American television series debuts
1999 American television series endings
1990s Canadian drama television series
1998 Canadian television series debuts
1999 Canadian television series endings
1990s French television series
1998 French television series debuts
1999 French television series endings
Highlander (franchise) television series
American television spin-offs
American action adventure television series
Canadian television spin-offs
Canadian action adventure television series
French television spin-offs
French action adventure television series
French drama television series
Television series by CBS Studios
Television shows filmed in Toronto
Television shows filmed in France
English-language television shows
First-run syndicated television programs
First-run syndicated television shows in Canada
First-run syndicated television programs in the United States
Science fantasy television series